The Picnic at Sakkara is a 1955 novel by P.H. Newby. It is about a lecturer at Cairo University, Edgar Perry, during the rule of King Farouk. He becomes tutor to a pasha, and is swept into a conflict between Western ways and the Moslem Brotherhood. It is a comedic novel.

Reception
Anthony Thwaite called it "wonderful", and said that it was Newby's "most successful and memorable achievement." Kirkus Reviews, however, found it to be "idiosyncratic" and an acquired taste.

References

1955 British novels
English-language novels
Novels set in Egypt
Jonathan Cape books